Viorel Doru Hizo (born 6 February 1947) is a Romanian football manager.

Coaching career 
Hizo coached several top teams in Romania, his first job as head coach was with his hometown club Inter Sibiu capturing the Balkans Cup title in 1991. He also managed Chongqing Qiche in China. He won the UEFA Intertoto Cup with FC Vaslui in 2008.

References

1947 births
Living people
Sportspeople from Sibiu
Romanian footballers
Romanian football managers
Chongqing Liangjiang Athletic F.C. managers
FC Inter Sibiu managers
FC Rapid București managers
FC Progresul București managers
FC Dinamo București managers
CSM Ceahlăul Piatra Neamț managers
FC Brașov (1936) managers
FCV Farul Constanța managers
FC Vaslui managers
FC Universitatea Cluj managers
CS Pandurii Târgu Jiu managers
Expatriate football managers in China
Romanian expatriates in China
Association football goalkeepers